Tahir Bisić (born 29 April 1981) is a Bosnian alpine skier. He competed in three events at the 2002 Winter Olympics. At these Games, he competed in three alpine skiing events: the giant slalom, where he placed 44th, the slalom, where he finished 29th, and the combined, where he did not finish the competition. These were the only Winter Olympics in which Tahir Bisić participated.

References

1981 births
Living people
Bosnia and Herzegovina male alpine skiers
Olympic alpine skiers of Bosnia and Herzegovina
Alpine skiers at the 2002 Winter Olympics
Place of birth missing (living people)